In the Blue Light is the fourteenth solo studio album by American folk rock singer-songwriter Paul Simon. Produced by Paul Simon and Roy Halee, it was released on September 7, 2018, through Legacy Recordings. The album consists of re-recordings of lesser-known songs from Simon's catalog, often altering their original arrangements, harmonic structures, and lyrics. The songs were recorded with guests including the instrumental ensemble yMusic, guitarist Bill Frisell, trumpeter Wynton Marsalis and Bryce Dessner. The album's title is a reference to the lyrics in the song "How the Heart Approaches What It Yearns" from the 1980 album One-Trick Pony.

Unreleased recordings
In an interview for CBC Radio, Simon confirmed that more songs were recorded during sessions for the album but ultimately left off the finished record. Outtakes include a number of unspecified songs from You're the One and a re-recording of "The Sound of Silence" with music based on the arrangement of Simon's live version from recent years. It is unknown whether or not these recordings will be released.

Reception

In the Blue Light was released to favorable reviews. At Metacritic, which assigns a normalized rating out of 100 to reviews from mainstream publications, the album received an average score of 70, based on eleven reviews.

Dave Simpson at The Guardian gave the album four stars and said that "generally, sparser arrangements allow more space for Simon’s dazzling imagery and oblique but relevant ruminations on [several] subjects." Jesse Hassenger of The A.V. Club gave the album a B- and wrote, "It would be easy to get bogged down in treating Blue Light as a compare/contrast exercise, but what’s most impressive about is the way that it sounds more or less of a piece as its own record." David Browne from Rolling Stone wrote that, "At its best, In the Blue Light amounts to a dream set list for devoted PaulHeads who wish he’d do entire shows of rarities." Stephen Thomas Erlewine of Allmusic opined that "Everything on In the Blue Light is deliberate, gentle, and subtle, placing as much emphasis on the words and melody as the instrumentation, which isn't necessarily the case with the dense original albums."

Track listing

Personnel
 Paul Simon – vocals, acoustic guitar, percussion, harmonium
 Bill Frisell – electric guitar
 Steve Gadd – drums
 Renaud Garcia-Fons – bass
 Joel Wenhardt – piano
 Nate Smith – drums
 Jim Oblon – guitar
 John Patitucci – bass
 Edie Brickell – finger snaps
 CJ Camerieri – trumpet
 Andy Snitzer – saxophone
 Sullivan Fortner – piano
 Wynton Marsalis – trumpet
 Marcus Printup – trumpet
 Dan Block – clarinet
 Walter Blanding – saxophone
 Wycliffe Gordon – tuba
 Chris Crenshaw – trombone
 Marion Felder – drums
 Herlin Riley – tambourine
 Odair Assad – guitar
 Sérgio Assad – guitar
 Walter Blanding – saxophone
 Jamey Haddad – percussion
 Vincent Nguini – electric guitar
 Mark Stewart – acoustic guitar
 Sullivan Fortner – piano, celeste
 Jack DeJohnette – drums
 Joe Lovano – saxophone

Charts

References

2018 albums
Paul Simon albums
Albums produced by Roy Halee
Albums produced by Paul Simon
Legacy Recordings albums